The Saint Lucia Red Cross ("SLRC") was founded in 1949 as a branch of the British Red Cross and became a society of its own in 1983. It has its headquarters in Castries, Saint Lucia.

External links
Official website

Red Cross and Red Crescent national societies
1949 establishments in the British Empire
Organizations established in 1983
Medical and health organisations based in Saint Lucia